Peter Frank Broadbent (15 May 1933 – 1 October 2013) was an English footballer. He won major domestic honours with Wolverhampton Wanderers and played in the 1958 FIFA World Cup.

Career
In his autobiography, George Best said he was a Wolves fan and that Broadbent was the player he most admired; the pair became friends in later life. Alex Ferguson also stated that, during his youth, Broadbent had been his favourite player.

Broadbent started his career with non-league Dover FC until he was signed by Brentford. He only spent a short time there before he was snapped up by Wolves, one of the top sides in the English league at the time, in February 1951 for a £10,000 fee. He would remain at the Black Country club for the next 14 years, scoring well over 100 goals and winning three league titles and an FA Cup, as well as being capped seven times at the highest level by England. He played his last Football League game in April 1970 for Stockport County.

Personal life 
Broadbent attended school in Deal. After his retirement from football, he ran a babywear shop in Halesowen with his wife Shirley. They later settled in Codsall. In April 2007, it was reported that Broadbent, now in his 74th year, was suffering from Alzheimer's disease, which had become evident in his mid-60s and was living in a care home near Wolverhampton. On 1 October 2013 he died, aged 80, having suffered from Alzheimer's for some 15 years.

Honours

As a player 
Wolverhampton Wanderers

First Division (3): 1953–54, 1957–58, 1958–59
FA Cup (1): 1959–60
FA Charity Shield (1): 1959

As an individual 
 Wolverhampton Wanderers Hall of Fame

References
Notes

Written works
 

1933 births
2013 deaths
English footballers
England international footballers
England B international footballers
England under-23 international footballers
English Football League players
1958 FIFA World Cup players
Brentford F.C. players
Wolverhampton Wanderers F.C. players
Shrewsbury Town F.C. players
Aston Villa F.C. players
Stockport County F.C. players
People from Dover District
Deaths from Alzheimer's disease
English Football League representative players
Bromsgrove Rovers F.C. players
Association football midfielders
FA Cup Final players
Deaths from dementia in England